Wang Hu; 1865 – April 25, 1933) was a politician of the Qing dynasty and the Republic of China.He was born in Baoding, Hebei. He was the 6th Republic-era mayor of Beijing. He was affiliated with the Zhili clique of the Beiyang government.

References

Bibliography
 
 「王瑚」 華夏人物庫-現代人物（華夏経緯網）
 

1865 births
1933 deaths
Qing dynasty politicians from Hebei
Republic of China politicians from Hebei
Mayors of Beijing
Members of the Zhili clique
Politicians from Baoding